Major-General Alexander Hugh Gatehouse DSO & bar MC (20 May 1895 – 21 August 1964) was a senior British Army officer who commanded the 10th Armoured Division during the North African campaign of the Second World War.

Military career
He joined the British Army and, after graduating from the Royal Military College, Sandhurst, was commissioned as a second lieutenant into the Northumberland Fusiliers in October 1914 and fought in the First World War. He was promoted to lieutenant in May 1915. He was awarded the Military Cross (MC) in September 1918, the citation for which reads:

In November 1918, with only a few days left in the war, he was awarded a bar to his MC. The bar's citation stated the following:

After the war he transferred to the Royal Tank Corps (later the Royal Tank Regiment) in 1931. He was appointed commandant of the Mechanisation Experimental Establishment at Farnborough in 1933. 

He served in the Second World War as deputy commander of the 7th Armoured Brigade in the Western Desert from 1940, as commander of the 4th Armoured Brigade in the Western Desert from April 1941 and as General Officer Commanding 10th Armoured Division from June 1942. His permanent rank was advanced to colonel on 6 November 1940, with seniority backdated to 1 July 1940. Having led the 10th Armoured Division at the Battle of Alam el Halfa in September 1942 and then the Second Battle of El Alamein in October 1942 he became major-general in charge of administration at Washington D. C. at the end of the year, and military attaché in Moscow in 1944 before retiring in 1947.

Family
In 1920 he married Helen Williams; they had one son, Sir Robert Alexander Gatehouse, a Judge of the Queen's Bench Division of the High Court).

References

Bibliography

External links
Generals of World War II

 

|-
 

1895 births
1964 deaths
British military attachés
British Army personnel of World War I
British Army generals of World War II
Royal Northumberland Fusiliers officers
Royal Tank Regiment officers
British Army major generals
Companions of the Distinguished Service Order
Recipients of the Military Cross
Graduates of the Royal Military College, Sandhurst
Academics of the Royal Military College, Sandhurst